Sir William Penn (23 April 1621 – 16 September 1670) was an English admiral and politician who sat in the House of Commons from 1660 to 1670. He was the father of William Penn, founder of the Province of Pennsylvania (today, Commonwealth of Pennsylvania).

Early life 
Penn was born in St Thomas Parish, Bristol to Giles Penn and Joan Gilbert. He served his apprenticeship at sea with his father.

Career

Naval career

In the First English Civil War of 1642–1646, he fought on the side of the Parliament, and commanded a ship in the squadron maintained against the king in the Irish seas. The service was arduous and called for both energy and good seamanship. In 1648, he was arrested and sent to London, but was soon released, and sent back as rear-admiral in the Assurance. The exact cause of the arrest remains unknown, but it may be presumed that he came under suspicion of corresponding with the king's supporters. It is highly probable that he did so, for, until the Restoration of 1660, he was regularly in communication with the Royalists, while serving the parliament, or Cromwell, so long as their service was profitable, and making no scruple of applying for grants of the confiscated lands of the king's Irish friends.

After 1650, Penn served as commander-in-chief of the southern fleet in the Atlantic and in the Mediterranean in pursuit of the Royalists under Prince Rupert. After an action at Macroom in County Cork, Ireland he was awarded Macroom Castle. He was so active on this service that when he returned home on 18 March 1651 he could boast that he had not put foot on shore for more than a year.

In the First Anglo-Dutch War (1652–1654), he served in the navy of the Commonwealth of England, commanding squadrons at the battles of the Kentish Knock (1652), Portland, the Gabbard and Scheveningen (1653). In this last battle, a sniper from his ship killed Dutch admiral and fleet commander Maarten Tromp on the Dutch flagship Brederode.

In 1654, he offered to carry the fleet over to the king, but in October of the same year he had no scruple in accepting the naval command in the expedition to the West Indies sent out by Cromwell. In 1655, he commanded the fleet that launched a bungled attack on La Hispaniola. He was not responsible for the shameful repulse at San Domingo, which was due to a panic among the troops. Afterwards, English forces seized the less desirable island of Jamaica for the Commonwealth régime, and Penn established the Jamaica Station there. On their return, he and his military colleague, Robert Venables, were sent to the Tower. He made a humble submission, and when released retired to the estates of confiscated land he had received in Ireland. On 20 December 1658, Penn was knighted by Henry Cromwell at Dublin Castle, but the Protectorate honour passed into oblivion at the Restoration in May 1660.

Political career
In April 1660, Penn was elected as one of the Members of Parliament for Weymouth and Melcombe Regis and sat in the Convention Parliament. He played a small part in the Restoration: in May 1660 he was on the Earl of Sandwich's ship, the Naseby (later the Royal Charles), which was sent to bring King Charles II home to England from his exile at Amsterdam in the Dutch Republic. During the voyage, Penn made himself known to the Duke of York, who was soon to be appointed Lord High Admiral, and with whom he had a lasting influence.

In 1661, Penn was re-elected as a member for Weymouth and Melcombe Regis in the Cavalier Parliament. In the Second Anglo-Dutch War, he was flag captain at the Battle of Lowestoft (1665), serving under James, Duke of York, and later in the same year was admiral of one of the fleets sent to intercept Ruyter, despite suffering from gout.

Although Penn was not a high-minded man, he is a figure of considerable importance in English naval history. As admiral and General at Sea for Parliament, he helped in 1653 to draw up the first code of tactics provided for the English navy, Duties of a Commander at Sea, 1664, Instructions by Sir W. Penn. It became the basis of the "Duke of York's Sailing and Fighting Instructions", which continued for long to supply the orthodox tactical creed of the navy. Penn was an early proponent of fighting in line ahead, so as to bring as much firepower as possible to bear.

Legacy

A key source for the adult life of Penn is the diary of his colleague at the Navy Board, and next door neighbour in Seething Lane, Samuel Pepys. However, Pepys's assessments have to be tempered by the jealousy that he evidently held for Penn. In 1660, Penn was appointed a Commissioner of the Navy Board where he worked with Pepys, Clerk of the Acts. The character of "mean fellow", or "false knave", given him by Pepys is borne out by much that is otherwise known of him. But it is no less certain that he was an excellent seaman and a good fighter.  Like Pepys and the Earl of Sandwich (Pepys' patron at the Navy Board) Penn was a "moderate" Roundhead who had succeeded in maintaining his position at the Restoration. Unsurprisingly, Penn appears several times in Pepys diary. A typical entry (5 April 1666) reads "To the office, where the falsenesse and impertinencies of Sir W. Pen would make a man mad to think of."

But he is referenced perhaps most vividly in an entry for 1665, which states: "At night home and up to the leads [roof], were contrary to expectation driven down again with a stinke by Sir W. Pen's shying of a shitten pot in their house of office".

On the other hand, the diary entry for 4 July 1666 contains a long account of Penn's analysis of what was to be learnt from the Four Days' Battle, ending with the statement: "He did talk very rationally to me, insomuch that I took more pleasure this night in hearing him discourse then I ever did in my life in anything that he said."

As a native of the West Country, Sir William Penn is buried in the church of St Mary Redcliffe in Bristol. His helm and half-armour are hung on the wall, together with the tattered banners of Dutch ships that he captured in battle. His portrait by Lely, part of the Flagmen of Lowestoft series, is in the Painted Hall at Greenwich. After his death, his son, William, accepted the grant of land in the American colonies in lieu of money owed by the Crown to his father. William Penn had wanted to call the land "New Wales", which was objected to by the Secretary of State, Privy Council member and Welshman Leoline Jenkins. Penn instead put forward the name "Sylvania". The Council then chose to tweak this new name a bit by adding the prefix "Penn" to honour the late Admiral, William Penn's father. After some protestation from William Penn, he reluctantly accepted it.

Personal life

On 6 June 1643, he married Margaret Jasper, a daughter of John Jasper, a wealthy Dutch merchant from Rotterdam. They had three children:
William Penn (1644–1718), who married Gulielma Maria Springett (1644–1694), and later, Hannah Margaret Callowhill (1671–1726) 
Margaret "Pegg" Penn, who married Anthony Lowther
Richard Penn

References

Sources 

 
 
 
 

Attribution

Further reading

External links 
 familysearch.org Accessed 3 November 2007
 Penn Family Genealogy 

1621 births
1670 deaths
17th-century Royal Navy personnel
Politicians from Bristol
Royal Navy admirals
English people of Welsh descent
Members of Trinity House
William
English MPs 1660
English MPs 1661–1679
Roundheads
Military personnel from Bristol
Prisoners in the Tower of London
Royal Navy personnel of the First Anglo-Dutch War
Royal Navy personnel of the Second Anglo-Dutch War
Lords of the Admiralty